The Zimbabwe cricket team toured Pakistan from 19 to 31 May 2015. The tour consisted of three One Day International (ODI) and two Twenty20 International (T20I) matches, all played at Gaddafi Stadium in Lahore. It was the first tour by a Test-playing nation since the attack on the Sri Lankan cricket team in 2009. Pakistan won the T20I series 2–0 and won the ODI series 2–0 after the third match finished as a no result. It was Pakistan's first ODI series win in two years. Pakistan ODI captain Azhar Ali said "it's been an exciting and emotional series for many reasons. It became important for us, as many of us never played in Pakistan, and winning makes it more significant because it gives you confidence".

Summary
Before the tour, several Zimbabwean cricketers expressed their concerns about travelling to Pakistan, but were committed to the trip. Pakistan captain Misbah-ul-Haq had described the tour as "a big joy for all of Pakistan cricket fans, players and for the PCB officials". Tony Irish, the executive chairman of the Federation of International Cricketers' Associations (FICA), said that "we are very concerned about the safety of players and any match officials who may be sent to Pakistan, should this tour go ahead". The International Cricket Council (ICC) announced that it was awaiting the outcome of a security report before deciding if it were to send officials, with the possibility that the Pakistan Cricket Board (PCB) would use its own officials if the ICC was unable to supply them.

Zimbabwe Cricket (ZC) were in talks with its own government regarding concerns over security. ZC caused confusion after issuing a press release on 14 May stating the tour had been suspended, but they retracted it just 15 minutes later. On 17 May ZC confirmed that the tour would go ahead. The ICC did not appoint any of its match officials, but made provision for the PCB to use their own umpires. The Zimbabwe team received state guest importance, including more than 4,000 police officers for their security  when they arrived in Pakistan at Allama Iqbal International Airport on 19 May to start the tour.

Only five players in the Pakistan T20 squad had played a home international match before this tour. Batsman Umar Akmal said that "it will be an amazing feeling, it would mean so much to me. Cricketers around the world take playing at home in front of their own crowds for granted". Tickets for both of the T20 matches sold out within two days, with 60,000 people attending the first game.

In the ODI series, Zimbabwe captain Elton Chigumbura was suspended for the last two matches, due to a bowling a slow over-rate in the first match. Hamilton Masakadza became the Zimbabwean captain for the final two matches in Chigumbura's absence.

During the second ODI match, there was a loud explosion outside the stadium that was thought to have been caused by an electricity transformer. It was later revealed to be a suicide attack that killed a civilian and a Punjab Police officer, while he was trying to stop the suicide bomber. The initial report of the transformer explosion was used to avoid a panic. Despite the attack, the third and final match of the series went ahead as scheduled.

After the matches had concluded, it was revealed that the PCB had paid the players in the Zimbabwe squad US$12,500 each for the tour. This was paid in two amounts, the first when Zimbabwe arrived in Pakistan, and the second after the tour dates had been fulfilled.

Squads

T20I series

1st T20I

2nd T20I

ODI series

1st ODI

2nd ODI

3rd ODI

References

External links
 Series home at ESPN Cricinfo

2015 in Pakistani cricket
2015 in Zimbabwean cricket
International cricket competitions in 2015
Zimbabwean cricket tours of Pakistan